The VI Constitutional Government was the sixth Constitutional Government (administration or cabinet) under the Constitution of East Timor.  Formed on 16 February 2015, it was led by the country's sixth Prime Minister, Rui Maria de Araújo, and was replaced by the VII Constitutional Government on 15 September 2017.

Composition
The government was made up of Ministers, Vice Ministers and Secretaries of State, as follows:

Ministers

Vice Ministers

Secretaries of State

References

Notes

Further reading

External links
Program of the Sixth Constitutional Government – Government of East Timor

Cabinets established in 2015
Cabinets established in 2017
Constitutional Governments of East Timor
2015 establishments in East Timor
2017 disestablishments in East Timor